Xijiang (Hmu: Fangb Dlib Jangl) is a rural town in Leishan County, Guizhou, China. The town is renowned for its Miao Villages and their custom and human relationships. 

Xijiang Qianhu Miao Village built unique wooden stilted buildings in the middle of the mountain. More than 1,000 stilted buildings are stacked with mountains and peaks as the terrain changes. The main attractions in Xijiang Qianhu Miao Village include Xijiang Miao Museum, Drum Head House, Hulu Head House, Brewing Workshop, Embroidery Workshop, Batik Workshop, Silver Decoration Workshop, Observation Deck, Karge Ancient Road, Pastoral Sightseeing Area, etc. Xijiang Qianhu Miao Village is an open-air museum that displays an epic about the development of the Miao nationality and has become a grandstand for viewing and studying the traditional culture of the Miao nationality.

History
On 14 October 2016, the town was listed among the first group of "Distinctive Towns in China" by the National Development and Reform Commission, Ministry of Finance and Ministry of Housing and Urban-Rural Development.

In November 2017, it was inscribed to the National Civilized Villages and Towns's List.

Administrative division
As of 2016, the town is divided into twenty-one villages and one community: 
 Xijiang Community
 Changwu Village
 Ganrong Village
 Kaijue Village
 Buzi Village
 Maliao Village
 Kongbai Village
 Wugao Village
 Liancheng Village
 Yingshang Village
 Baibi Village
 Maobiling Village
 Longtang Village
 Beijiang Village
 Yangwu Village
 Zhongzhai Village
 Huangli Village
 Dalong Village
 Xiaolong Village
 Wuyao Village
 Jiaoyao Village
 Xijiang Village

Geography
It is surrounded by Paiyang Township of Taijiang County on the northeast, Fangxiang Township on the east, Sankeshu Town of Kaili on the west, and Danjiang Town on the south.

Economy
The economy is supported primarily by tourism and Chinese herbal medicine.

The area contains a rich supply of silicon, arsenic, lead, and zinc.

Transportation
S63 is a north-south highway in the town.

Attractions
Miao Stockade Village of Thousand Households is a famous scenic spot in China.

References

Divisions of Leishan County
Towns of Qiandongnan Miao and Dong Autonomous Prefecture